Maria Rabinky was born in Saint-Petersburg, the "cultural hub" of Russia. She has a dual Master of Fine Arts degree in both architecture and visual arts from the St. Petersburg Academy of Fine Arts. After the academy, she honed her skills as an architect and interior and museum designer.

Career 
After moving to Richmond, VA in 1994, Maria continued to work in watercolors, drawing with pencil and ink, with an emphasis on architectural renderings, urban and country landscapes, and map illustration. She then extended her talents in traditional art into the electronic arts. As a mixed-media artist, she frequently merges both art forms in creating her illustrated maps and other illustration, to achieve the warmth of hand creations combined with the utility and flexibility of layers and PDFs needed for production and proofing. Maria Rabinky became a well-known commercial map illustrator creating pictorial maps (bird-eye-view maps) for various applications.
Maria is a member of the Graphic Artists Guild, Society of Architectural Illustrators.

Maria Rabinky is founder, owner and principal of the art studio Rabinky Art, LLC located in Richmond, VA.

If name just a few of her recent and current clients, her portfolio corresponds with the wide ranging of her talents: UCLA, travel agency Discovery Maps International, Library of Congress, The Isaac Walton League, dozens of real estate developers, contract illustrator for architects, Garmany Magazine, Nissan, World Wrestling Entertainment, University of Richmond, Bryn Mawr College.

References 
 Custom Unique Illustration: https://rabinkyart.com/illustration
 Wonderful World Map Illustration - https://rabinkyart.com/illustration/wonderful-world-map-illustration
 Illustrated Map of the United Kingdom - https://rabinkyart.com/illustration/illustrated-map-of-the-united-kingdom
 Bryn Mawr College campus map: http://www.brynmawr.edu/campus/map.shtml
 Choate Rosemary Hall campus map: https://web.archive.org/web/20130624045521/http://www.choate.edu/aboutchoate/pdf/mapwithkey.pdf
 Georgian Court University campus map: https://archive.today/20121211101637/http://www.georgian.edu/virtual_tour/campus_map.htm
 Barry University campus map:http://www.barry.edu/about/locations/?source=google&places_barry_main_campus
 Illustration for Mercer University magazine:  http://www.mercer.edu/features/macon/
 Gillette College Campus map: https://web.archive.org/web/20150613032108/http://www.sheridan.edu/site/assetlibrary/common/maps/campus_map_gillette.pdf
 NVTC's Techtopia Map 2010: https://web.archive.org/web/20120118035941/http://www.nvtc.org/techtopia/2010Map/index.html
 Budget Travel Magazine: http://www.budgettravel.com/feature/arizona-map,7058/
 Win Country Santa Barbara: https://web.archive.org/web/20120313093613/http://wincountryca.com/
 Izaak Walton League of America "How to build a vernal pond": https://web.archive.org/web/20130109211142/http://www.iwla.org/index.php?ht=a%2FGetDocumentAction%2Fi%2F1013
 Wet 'n Wild Orlando Water Park Map: http://www.wetnwildorlando.com/map.php
 The CSO Magazine article "Test Your Convergence": https://books.google.com/books?id=BGAEAAAAMBAJ&pg=PA41
 The CSO Magazine article "The Art of Securing Pricelessness": https://books.google.com/books?id=8F8EAAAAMBAJ&pg=PA43
 GolfDigest Magazine: http://www.golfdigest.com/golf-tours-news/us-open/2008-06/gw20080606strege

External links
Rabinky Art, LLC
Illustrated maps by Maria Rabinky
About Maria Rabinky

1959 births
American women illustrators
American illustrators
20th-century American painters
21st-century American painters
Living people
Architects from Richmond, Virginia
Architects from Saint Petersburg
Leningrad School artists
20th-century American women artists
21st-century American women artists
American women painters
Russian emigrants to the United States